SK Stap Tratec Vilémov is a Czech football club located in Vilémov (Děčín District) in the Ústí nad Labem Region. It currently plays on the 5th tier of the Czech football system.

References

External links
 
http://www.fotbalaz.cz/clanek.php?zobraz=clanek&clanek_id=33

Football clubs in the Czech Republic
Association football clubs established in 1956
Děčín District